Franziska Gritsch (born 15 March 1997) is an Austrian World Cup alpine ski racer and specializes in the technical events of slalom and giant slalom. She competed in three World Championships, winning a silver medal in the team event in 2019.

World Cup results

Season standings

Race podiums
 0 wins
 3 podiums (1 SG, 1 AC, 1 PS); 12 top tens

World Championship results

References

External links

Austrian Ski Team – official site – Franziska Gritsch – 

1997 births
Living people
Austrian female alpine skiers
Sportspeople from Innsbruck
20th-century Austrian women
21st-century Austrian women